David Lee "Dave" Wharton (born May 19, 1969) is an American former competition swimmer, Olympic medalist, and former world record-holder in two events.  During his competition swimming career, Wharton set world records in both the 200-meter and 400-meter individual medley events.

Swimming career
Wharton achieved his first recognition in international swimming as an 18-year-old at the 1987 Pan Pacific Swimming Championships in Brisbane, Australia, where he won gold medals in both the 200- and 400-meter individual medley events.  He was recognized as the American Swimmer of the Year, together with Janet Evans, by Swimming World Magazine in 1987.

Wharton represented the United States at the 1988 Summer Olympics in Seoul, South Korea.  He received a silver medal for his second-place performance in the men's 400-meter individual medley, in which he recorded a time of 4:17.36 in the event final.  He also competed in the B Final of the men's 200-meter individual medley, finishing ninth overall with a time of 2:03.50.

Wharton attended the University of Southern California (USC), where he swam for the USC Trojans swimming and diving team in National Collegiate Athletic Association (NCAA) and Pacific-10 Conference competition from 1988 to 1991.  While swimming for the Trojans, he was recognized as the Pac-10 Male Swimmer of the Year four consecutive years.  He won three NCAA national championships in the 200-yard individual medley (1988–1990) and four more NCAA championships in the 400-yard individual medley (1988–1991).

He repeated his performance at the 1989 Pan Pacific Swimming Championships in Tokyo, again winning gold medals in the 200- and 400-meter individual medley events, as well as a silver medal in the 200-meter butterfly.

At the 1992 Summer Olympics in Barcelona, Spain, Wharton again competed in the men's 400-meter individual medley, bettering his 1988 Olympic time with a 4:17.26 and finishing fourth overall.  He also swam in the men's 200-meter butterfly, advancing to the B Final and posting a time of 2:01.08.

Life after swimming
Wharton, who was a longtime resident of Warminster, Pennsylvania, currently resides in New Albany, Ohio, and serves as the Parks and Recreation Director for the City of New Albany and coaches high school swim and dive team.

See also
 List of Olympic medalists in swimming (men)
 List of University of Southern California people
 World record progression 200 metres individual medley
 World record progression 400 metres individual medley

References

1969 births
Living people
American male butterfly swimmers
American male medley swimmers
World record setters in swimming
Germantown Academy alumni
Olympic silver medalists for the United States in swimming
People from New Albany, Ohio
Sportspeople from Ohio
Sportspeople from Pennsylvania
Swimmers at the 1988 Summer Olympics
Swimmers at the 1992 Summer Olympics
USC Trojans men's swimmers
People from Abington Township, Montgomery County, Pennsylvania
Medalists at the 1988 Summer Olympics
People from Warminster, Pennsylvania
20th-century American people
21st-century American people